Adenodolichos punctatus is a plant in the legume family Fabaceae, native to tropical Africa.

Description
Inflorescences feature white, green or purplish flowers.

Distribution and habitat
Adenodolichos punctatus is native to south-central and southern tropical Africa, from the Democratic Republic of the Congo southeast to Mozambique. Its habitat is in woodland.

References

punctatus
Flora of the Democratic Republic of the Congo
Flora of Tanzania
Flora of South Tropical Africa
Plants described in 1894
Taxa named by Hermann Harms